Bonnie Mitchelson (born November 28, 1947) is a politician in Manitoba, Canada. She was a Progressive Conservative member of the Manitoba legislature from 1986 to 2014, and served as a cabinet minister in the government of Gary Filmon from 1988 to 1999.  She also served as interim leader of the Progressive Conservative Party in 2000, following Filmon's resignation.

Early life and history

Born Bonnie Bester, the daughter of Henry Bester and Millie Leslie, she was educated at the Health Sciences Centre School of Nursing and practiced as a Registered Nurse. In 1969, she married Don Mitchelson, who has been a politician, having served as a city councillor in Winnipeg.

Political career

She was first elected to the Manitoba legislature in 1986, defeating incumbent New Democrat Phil Eyler in the northeast Winnipeg riding of River East. She was re-elected by a wider margin in 1988, as Filmon's Tories won a minority government.

On May 9, 1988, Mitchelson was appointed Minister of Culture, Heritage and Recreation (later renamed Culture, Heritage and Citizenship), with responsibility for the Manitoba Lotteries Foundation Act. On February 5, 1991, she was also named Minister of Multiculturalism with responsibility for Status of Women. As Minister of Culture, Mitchelson made the controversial decision to establish a review commission for Manitoba's arts policy that was made up entirely of non-artists.

After a cabinet shuffle on September 10, 1993, she was named Minister of Family Services, and retained the position until the Filmon government was defeated in 1999. Prior to the election of 1999, she proposed a series of workfare measures as part of a policy of welfare reform.

Mitchelson was re-elected by a comfortable margin in 1990, and again in 1995 and 1999. She was chosen as interim leader of the Progressive Conservative Party on May 29, 2000, and held the position until Stuart Murray was acclaimed as party leader in November. She was then named as the party's Deputy Leader. She was the first woman chosen to lead the Manitoba Progressive Conservative party, and only the third female party leader in Manitoba's history.

In the general election of 2003, Mitchelson defeated New Democrat Doug Longstaffe, 4,935 votes to 4,402. She was the only Progressive Conservative MLA to hold a seat in the north of Winnipeg.

She was a supporter of Hugh McFadyen's campaign to succeed Stuart Murray as leader of the Progressive Conservative Party, and was narrowly re-elected in the 2007 provincial election.

Retirement
Bonnie Mitchelson announced her retirement from provincial politics in October 2014.

Electoral results

References 

1947 births
Living people
Women government ministers of Canada
Female Canadian political party leaders
Members of the Executive Council of Manitoba
Politicians from Winnipeg
Progressive Conservative Party of Manitoba MLAs
21st-century Canadian politicians
21st-century Canadian women politicians
Women MLAs in Manitoba